Pigeon Key is a small island containing the historic district of Pigeon Key, Florida. The  island is home to 8 buildings on the National Register of Historic Places, some of which remain from its earliest incarnation as a work camp for the Florida East Coast Railway. Today these buildings serve a variety of purposes, ranging from housing for educational groups to administrative offices for the non-profit Pigeon Key Foundation. The former Assistant Bridge Tender's House has been converted into a small museum featuring artifacts and images from Pigeon Key's colorful past.  It is located off the old Seven Mile Bridge, at approximately mile marker 45, west of Knight's Key, (city of Marathon in the middle Florida Keys) and just east of Moser Channel, which is the deepest section of the  span.

The island was originally known as "Cayo Paloma" (literally translated as "Pigeon Key") on many old Spanish charts - said  to have been named for large flocks of white-crowned pigeons (Columba leucocephala Linnaeus) which once roosted there.  During the building of Henry Flagler's Overseas Railroad Key West Extension between 1908 and 1912, there were at times as many as 400 workers housed on the island. While these workers built many bridges along the route through the lower keys, the Seven Mile Bridge, spanning the gap between Knight's Key and Little Duck Key remains the largest and most impressive component of what was once referred to as "the 8th Wonder of the World".  A number of buildings from the Flagler era remain on the island and are now part of the Pigeon Key Historic District.

Pigeon Key was one of the locations for the "Bal Harbor Institute" in the 1995 series of Flipper. It was seen in three episodes during season one including the pilot episode. It was also the site of the Finish Line of The Amazing Race 18 "Unfinished Business" in 2011.

Pigeon Key Historic District

The Pigeon Key Historic District is a U.S. historic district (designated as such on March 16, 1990) located on Pigeon Key in Florida. The district is off U.S. 1 at mile marker 45. It contains 11 historic buildings and 3 structures.  The old Seven Mile Bridge (closed to vehicular traffic) crosses over the island and has a pedestrian exit ramp going to the island.

References

External links
Pigeon Key Foundation
History of Pigeon Key
Pigeon Key - Marathon Key Florida Keys Official Tourism Site Heart of the Florida Keys
 Monroe County listings at National Register of Historic Places

Islands of the Florida Keys
Islands of Monroe County, Florida
National Register of Historic Places in Monroe County, Florida
Historic districts on the National Register of Historic Places in Florida
Islands of Florida